Lorraine Archibald “Archie” Garner (February 24, 1904 – May 7, 1969) was an American sculptor.

During the New Deal he was commissioned by the Public Works of Art Project and Treasury Section of Painting and Sculpture to create several notable works of art for public buildings, all within the state of California.

 Astronomers Monument at Griffith Observatory, commissioned by the Public Works of Art Project (PWAP), was Garner's design, and he was one of the six contributing sculptors. The monument honoring Hipparchus, Copernicus, Galileo, Kepler, Newton, and Herschel, was dedicated in November 25, 1934. A casting of the face of Garner’s Copernicus is at the Clark Library.
Law, or The Law, was originally produced under the auspices of PWAP. 
 Garner designed and carved the mahogany relief depicting the history of Centinela Springs for the Inglewood, California, post office.

 The Transportation of the Mail reliefs for the downtown San Diego post office building are the only federally funded New Deal sculpture in that city. The terra cotta reliefs depict “a train, a ship, an airplane, and a car, are placed over the windows at the front entrance. An inscription placed in the frieze carried by the pilasters of the front elevation reads, ‘Through science and the toil of patient men, the nation's thoughts traverse the land, sea, and air.’”
Garner, who was born in Fresno, California, also helped design the original Dennis the Menace Playground, did set design work for movie studios, and taught at Monterey Peninsula College and Occidental College.

References 

1904 births
1969 deaths
Section of Painting and Sculpture artists
Public Works of Art Project artists
20th-century American male artists
Sculptors from California